Hans Stefan Santesson (July 8, 1914, Paris – February 18, 1975, Edgewater, New Jersey) was an American editor, writer, and reviewer.

Career
He edited the selections of the Unicorn Mystery Book Club in the latter 1940s and early 1950s, the magazines Fantastic Universe from 1956 to 1960, the US edition of the British New Worlds Science Fiction in 1960 and the US version of The Saint Mystery Magazine from 1959 to 1967, and went on to edit several science fiction and fantasy anthologies, including:

 The Fantastic Universe Omnibus (1960)
 Rulers of Men (1965)
 Gods for Tomorrow (1967)
 Flying Saucers in Fact and Fiction (1968)
 Crime Prevention in the 30th Century (1969)
 The Mighty Barbarians: Great Sword and Sorcery Heroes (1969)
 Gentle Invaders (1969)
 The Mighty Swordsmen (1970)
 The Days After Tomorrow (1971)
President and chairman of the board, of the Society for the Study of the Unexplained.

References

External links

American magazine editors
Science fiction editors
1914 births
1975 deaths
20th-century American novelists
American male novelists
Edgar Award winners
American science fiction writers
20th-century American male writers
20th-century American non-fiction writers
American male non-fiction writers